LeRon Terrell McCoy (born January 24, 1982) is a former American football wide receiver. He was originally drafted by the Arizona Cardinals in the seventh round of the 2005 NFL Draft. He played college football at Indiana University of Pennsylvania.

He was also a member of the San Francisco 49ers, Houston Texans, and California Redwoods.

Early years
McCoy attended Harrisburg High School in his freshman year. He then attended Bishop McDevitt High School, from his sophomore year to his senior year. He lettered three times in football.

College career
McCoy attended Indiana University of Pennsylvania. McCoy saw limited time as a reserve in his true freshman season in 2001 before breaking out with 30 catches for 640 yards and eight touchdowns as a 13-game starter in 2002. He had 36 receptions for 521 yards and six touchdowns as a junior in 2003 and 36 receptions for 701 yards and 10 touchdowns as a senior in 2004.

He finished his college career with 110 receptions for 2,096 yards (19.1 yards per rec. avg.), and 25 touchdowns. His 110 receptions rank eighth on the school's career record list.

Professional career

At the NFL Combine in February 2005, McCoy ran the 40-yard dash in 4.4 seconds, the 4th fastest time among wide receivers present.

Arizona Cardinals
During the 2005 season, McCoy saw some action during the regular season, catching 18 passes for 191 yards. He also scored his first NFL touchdown. McCoy impressed observers at training camp in 2006, but was injured early in the season and placed on injured reserve.

Personal life
McCoy is the older brother of former NFL running back LeSean McCoy.

References

External links
Houston Texans bio

1982 births
Living people
American football wide receivers
IUP Crimson Hawks football players
Arizona Cardinals players
San Francisco 49ers players
Houston Texans players
Sacramento Mountain Lions players
Players of American football from Harrisburg, Pennsylvania